"The One with George Stephanopoulos" is the fourth episode of the first season of the NBC television series Friends. The fourth episode of the show overall, it was first broadcast on October 13, 1994. The episode was directed by James Burrows and written by Alexa Junge. This episode is the first of many that splits the gang into two separate stories based on gender. The guys go to a hockey game, where Ross (David Schwimmer) gets hit in the face with a hockey puck. The rest of the evening is spent in the ER, where a surly receptionist gets her nose broken when the puck goes flying. Meanwhile, the girls, sparked by celebrations over Rachel's first paycheck, spy on George Stephanopoulos, then President Clinton's top aide, which culminates in them seeing Stephanopoulos nude.

Plot 
When Phoebe cannot get any sleep because her grandmother is having loud sex with her boyfriend, Monica invites her to sleep over at her apartment with her and Rachel.

Chandler and Joey go to the coffee house to invite Ross to a hockey game as a "late birthday present". Ross is reluctant after becoming depressed about the day being the anniversary of him and ex-wife Carol sleeping together for the first time. He eventually accepts after Joey is able to convince him after promising him a foam finger.

At the hockey game, Ross continues to reminisce on Carol, which makes him depressed once again, and annoys Chandler and Joey. He becomes happy again when the game starts but is soon hit in the face with the hockey puck and are forced to head to the hospital where they deal with a snippy receptionist, Nurse Sizemore (Mary Pat Gleason). While waiting around, Ross admits to Chandler and Joey that the memory is important to him as it was the day he lost his virginity. After Ross is fit in a nose cast, he encounters a bratty boy (Benjamin Caya) who "found" the hockey puck that hit Ross and claims it as his own. Ross asks for it back and the kid refuses. After a short brawl over the puck, it flies out of the boy's grasp and it hits the receptionist in the face, which Ross admits was fun.

Meanwhile, Rachel receives her first paycheck. She is very excited at first only to discover she will not have much after taxes. She also gets reunited with her old friends, Leslie (Leesa Bryte), Kiki (Michele Maika), and Joanne (Marianne Hagan). While they boast about their career and family achievements, she feels increasingly depressed because of her low income. Back at the apartment, while the girls are getting ready for their slumber party, Rachel gets a call from her credit card company and complains about her low income. Monica and Phoebe try to cheer her up with no effect as it actually makes them depressed too.

A pizza delivery guy (Sean Whalen) arrives, although he brings them the wrong pizza; the one he brought was meant for "G. Stephanopoulos". The girls pay for the pizza and head to the balcony with binoculars to spy on George. As they spy on him, they get drunk and start telling each other secrets. This ends up in a brawl between Monica and Rachel, with Phoebe stopping them once she spots George. They beg him to take his towel off, which he does.

During the credits, Joey and the girls are playing Twister. Rachel gets another call from her credit card company; Chandler takes her place in the game. When asked why she has not been using her card, she says she is doing fine, confident in her independence.

Reception
Joe Reid and Sonia Saraiya of The A.V. Club both commented on the episode, Saraiya said; ""The One With George Stephanopoulos" uses a tried-and-true sitcom convention—it splits the cast on gender lines and sends them off to different adventures, allowing them to "bro out" or have "girl talk" as need be. Chandler, Joey, and Ross have a hockey adventure, which is punctuated by Ross' reminisces of his "first time" with Carol and ends up, obviously, in the emergency room; meanwhile, the girls, led by Rachel, worry about their life plans and also get drunk and also spy on George Stephanopoulos, who is soooo dreamy. Of the two stories, the latter has real staying power—the conversation feels like it could have been written today, or to be more exact, it feels like it was transcribed verbatim from the conversation that occurred on my couch last night." Reid said; "In "The One With George Stephanopoulos," Rachel is very much questioning her decision, and after spending an afternoon with her squealing Fifth Avenue friends, she's really having second thoughts. Of course, there isn't an existential crisis on Earth that couldn't have been solved by the chance to gawk at George Stephanopoulos from across an alleyway. At least in 1994. I was genuinely shocked to remember that there was a time that Stephanopoulos was a sex symbol. What desperate, pre-Clooney times those were!".

Notes

References

External links 
 

1994 American television episodes
Friends (season 1) episodes
Television episodes directed by James Burrows